El Ghawaben is a village about 4 km from Faraskur, Egypt and 15 km from Damietta. The village has a hospital and two primary schools, one of which is exclusively for girls.

References

Villages in Egypt